John Carroll Alexy (born January 19, 2003) is an American swimmer. At the 2020 United States Olympic trials, Alexy recorded a time of 48.69, improving on his personal best of 49.31. Alexy's time also took down Caeleb Dressel's National Age Group Record of 48.78 that was set back in 2015.

Career
Raised in Mendham Borough, New Jersey, Alexy attended Delbarton School where he won state titles at the New Jersey State Interscholastic Athletic Association Meet of Champions in the 50 and 100-meter freestyle events as a freshman and again as a junior, joining two of his three siblings who also won state swimming individual titles.

In 2021 during the 2020 United States Olympic trials, Alexy recorded a new best time of 48.69, considerably less than his previous personal best of 49.31, which had been used as his entry time and seeded him in 21st position. He also broke Caeleb Dressel's National Age Group record of 48.78, which had been set in 2015 during the United States Nationals.

Personal best times

Long course meters (50 m pool)

Legend: h — prelims heat

Short course yards (25 yd pool)

Legend: h — prelims heat

References 

2003 births
Living people
American male freestyle swimmers
Delbarton School alumni
People from Mendham Borough, New Jersey
People from Morristown, New Jersey
Sportspeople from Morris County, New Jersey
Swimmers from New Jersey
21st-century American people